Prospect Quarry is a  Site of special scientific interest which is located north-west of the village of Shalcombe located close to the south-west coast of the Isle of Wight. The site was notified in 1971 for both its biological and geological features.

References

Natural England citation sheet

Sites of Special Scientific Interest on the Isle of Wight